F650 may refer to:

 Ford F-650, a heavy duty truck
 BMW F650 single, a former BMW motorcycle
 F650 Pickups, an aftermarket automotive manufacture and distributor